The 1932 Queensland state election was held on 11 June 1932.

By-elections

 On 26 October 1929, John Blackley (CPNP) was elected to succeed David Weir (Labor), who had died on 22 September, as the member for Maryborough.
 On 10 May 1930, John O'Keefe (Labor) was elected to succeed William McCormack (Labor), who had died on 21 February, as the member for Cairns.
 On 28 June 1930, Arnold Wienholt (Independent) was elected to succeed Ernest Bell (CPNP), who had died on 2 May, as the member for Fassifern.

Retiring Members
Note: Dalby CPNP MLA Wilfred Russell had died prior to the election; no by-election was held.

Labor
Arthur Jones MLA (Burke)
Mick Kirwan MLA (Brisbane)
Vern Winstanley MLA (Queenton)
Alfred Jones MLA (Paddington) – did not contest initial election but subsequently endorsed for the supplementary election in Hamilton following the death of the original Labor candidate

CPNP
Richard Bow MLA (Mitchell)
Robert Boyd MLA (Burnett)
William Carter MLA (Fitzroy)
Charles Jamieson MLA (Lockyer) – elected as Independent
George Tedman MLA (Maree)
Richard Warren MLA (Murrumba)

Candidates
Sitting members at the time of the election are shown in bold text.

See also
 1932 Queensland state election
 Members of the Queensland Legislative Assembly, 1929–1932
 Members of the Queensland Legislative Assembly, 1932–1935
 List of political parties in Australia

References
 

Candidates for Queensland state elections